Kanoon Apna Apna is a 1989 Indian Hindi-language action-drama film starring Dilip Kumar, Nutan, Sanjay Dutt, Madhuri Dixit in pivotal roles. The film was a remake of Telugu film Collector Gari Abbai.

Plot
The Collector of Anokhapur, Jagatpratap Singh is a stickler for law and order. However, his son, Ravi believes that sometimes illegal means may be adopted in order to assert control. This causes conflict between the two. Ravi then falls in love with Editor Ramprasad's daughter, Bharathi. Bhushannath Bhadbole and Kabza Kanhaiyalal are corrupt ministers. Their sons, Kailash and Prakash respectively, rape and kill Jagatpratap's maid-servant and also kill Ravi's friend. They are acquitted because they gave fake alibis. Ravi decides to give these criminals the punishment they deserve. As Ravi knows this will cause a conflict with his father, he decides to leave home. He then becomes a police inspector. This does not heal the father-son bond as he still has different ideas about the meaning of justice. After deliberating on the statement that "the law is for human beings but not for monsters", the father finally agrees to join his son in his fight against the corrupt ministers.

Cast
 Dilip Kumar as Collector Jagatpratap Singh 
 Nutan as Laxmi Singh
 Sanjay Dutt as Inspector Ravi Kumar Singh
 Madhuri Dixit as Bharati
 Kader Khan as Bhushannath Bhadbole / Dharmendra 
 Anupam Kher as Kabza Kanhaiyalal 
 Gulshan Grover as Kailash Bhadbole 
 Tej Sapru as Prakash Kanhaiyalal
 Satyendra Kapoor as Editor Ram Prasad 
 Mayur Verma as Satyen 
 Raza Murad as Dr. Mathur 
 Jayshree Gadkar as College Principal 
 Shagufta Ali as Basanti 
 Disco Shanti as Item Number
 Lavu Nageswara Rao as Police Officer

Soundtrack
The soundtrack was written by Indeevar and composed by Bappi Lahiri.

External links 
 

1989 films
1980s action drama films
1980s Hindi-language films
Films directed by B. Gopal
Films scored by Bappi Lahiri
Indian action drama films
Hindi remakes of Telugu films